Diaphus taaningi, the Slopewater lanternfish, is a species of lanternfish found in the Eastern Atlantic Ocean.

Size

Etymology
The fish is named in honor of Danish lanternfish expert Åge Vedel Tåning (1890–1958), who loaned the type specimens to Norman and provided additional information about them.

References

Myctophidae
Taxa named by John Roxborough Norman
Fish described in 1930
Fish of the East Atlantic